Annie Namala is an Indian social activist and has been working for dalit rights. She is the director of Centre for Social Equity and Inclusion. She is a vocal voice in the fight of untouchable movement. She was appointed as a member of the National Advisory Council for the implementation of the RTE act in 2010.

Career
Annie Namala also worked with Solidarity Group for Children Against Discrimination and Exclusion (SGCADE).

References

External links
 Annie Namala's blog
 Program for Education and Awareness Building

Social workers
Dalit activists
Living people
Year of birth missing (living people)